Morris David Rosenbaum (July 11, 1831 – August 10, 1885) was a prominent businessman in early Utah and one of the few Jewish people to join the Church of Jesus Christ of Latter-day Saints (LDS Church) during the 19th century.

Rosenbaum was born in Fordon which was then part of the Grand Duchy of Posen.

In 1850 Rosenbaum emigrated to the United States.  Although he originally landed at New York City, he then traveled to San Francisco.  From San Francisco, he traveled to Carson River Valley in what is now Nevada.  He associated with Mormons there and then moved to Salt Lake City in 1856.  There he associated with Alexander Neibaur, from whom he learned more of the Mormon faith. He read the entire Book of Mormon before making up his mind about the church.  He was baptized in March 1858 by John Tingey. In April 1858, Rosenbaum married Alice Breakell Neibaur, the daughter of Alexander Neibaur.  They had thirteen children.

Rosenbaum owned and operated Hotel Brigham City in Brigham City, Utah Territory, to house, among others, railroad workers constructing the intercontinental railway. He also owned and operated a store. His wife Alice did much of the running of the hotel and was assisted in this by her sister Rebecca.  From about 1865, Charles W. Nibley had worked as a clerk for Rosenbaum in Rosenbaum's mercantile establishment, and it was as a result of this employment that Nibley met Rosenbaum's sister-in-law Rebecca Neibauer, whom Nibley latter married.

In 1868, Rosenbaum married Abigail H. Snow, a daughter of Lorenzo Snow and Harriet Amelia Squires. They had at least seven children.

In 1880, Rosenbaum was a missionary for the LDS Church in (Germany). He was made president of the North German District, and preached Mormonism in Berlin.  From August 19–21, 1880, Rosenbaum was imprisoned for preaching.  After his release, he preached in Bavaria, Baden, Württemberg and Hanover.

Rosenbaum died at Mink Creek, in present-day Franklin County, Idaho and was buried in Brigham City.

Notes

References

Further reading
 .

1831 births
1885 deaths
19th-century Mormon missionaries
Converts to Mormonism from Judaism
German emigrants to the United States
19th-century German Jews
German Latter Day Saints
German Mormon missionaries
Mormon missionaries in Germany
People from Brigham City, Utah